Salomon Nirisarike (born 23 March 1993) is a Rwandan international footballer who plays as a defender.

Club career
Born in Gisenyi, Nirisarike spent his early career with for Isonga, Royal Antwerp, Sint-Truidense and Tubize. 
On 1 September 2019, Nirisarike signed for FC Pyunik, extending his contract with Pyunik on 2 December 2019.

On 19 February 2021, Nirisarike joined FC Urartu. On 2 June 2022 Nirisarike left Urartu after his contract expired.

International career
Nirisarike made his international debut for Rwanda in 2012, and he has appeared in FIFA World Cup qualifying matches.

References

1993 births
Living people
Rwandan footballers
Rwanda international footballers
Isonga F.C. players
Royal Antwerp F.C. players
Sint-Truidense V.V. players
A.F.C. Tubize players
FC Pyunik players
Challenger Pro League players
Belgian Pro League players
Armenian Premier League players
Association football defenders
Rwandan expatriate footballers
Rwandan expatriate sportspeople in Belgium
Expatriate footballers in Belgium
Rwandan expatriate sportspeople in Armenia
Expatriate footballers in Armenia
People from Gisenyi
FC Urartu players